The following is a list of mountains, peaks and hills in Hong Kong.  

In the romanisation system used by the Hong Kong Government known as Standard Romanisation, 'shan' and 'leng' are the transliterations of the Cantonese words for 'mount' (山) and 'ridge' (嶺), respectively. 'Toi', 'kong', 'fung' and 'koi' also correspond to 'mount' in English and 'teng' corresponds to 'peak'.  It is this system which is used in the list below.

Highest peaks of Hong Kong

Lesser Hills

There are numerous smaller hills that dot Hong Kong and some that have disappeared with re-development:

Volcanoes 

Tai Mo Shan
High Island Supervolcano
Kwun Yam Shan, Lam Tsuen

Removed hills 
Cheung Pei Shan
Sacred Hill

See also

 Geography of Hong Kong
 Mountain Search and Rescue Company

References

External links

Peaks in Hong Kong, with heights in metre and pictures

Hong Kong
Mountains, peaks

Hong Kong